This is a timeline of incidents in 2004 that have been labelled as "terrorism" and are not believed to have been carried out by a government or its forces (see state terrorism and state-sponsored terrorism).

List guidelines
 To be included, entries must be notable (have a stand-alone article) and described by a consensus of reliable sources as "terrorism".
 List entries must comply with the guidelines outlined in the manual of style under MOS:TERRORIST.
 Casualty figures in this list are the total casualties of the incident, including immediate casualties and later casualties (such as people who succumbed to their wounds long after the attacks occurred).
Casualties listed are the victims. Perpetrator casualties are listed separately (e.g. x (+y) indicate that x victims and y perpetrators were killed/injured).
Casualty totals may be underestimated or unavailable due to a lack of information. A figure with a plus (+) sign indicates that at least that many people have died (e.g. 10+ indicates that at least 10 people have died) – the actual toll could be considerably higher.
 If casualty figures are 20 or more, they will be shown in bold. In addition, figures for casualties more than 50 will also be underlined.
In addition to the guidelines above, the table also includes the following categories:

January  
Total incidents:

February  
Total incidents:

March  
Total incidents:

April  
Total incidents:

May  
Total incidents:

June  
Total incidents:

July  
Total incidents:

August  
Total incidents:

September  
Total incidents:

October 
Total incidents:

November  
Total incidents:

December  
Total incidents:

See also
List of non-state terrorist incidents
ETA attacks in 2004
List of Qassam rocket attacks
List of Palestinian suicide attacks
List of Palestinian rocket attacks on Israel, 2001–2006

References

 
 2004
 2004
 
 
 2004
Terr